The siege of Bilär was a battle for the capital city of the Volga Bulgaria between the Volga Bulgars and the Mongols. It took place in autumn 1236 and lasted for 45 days. It ended with the total destruction of Bilär and the massacre of its population, estimated several dozen thousands.

After the battle of Samara Bend the Bolghars renovated all fortification of Bilär, the city was encircled with the third 11-kilometre-long wall of stone and wood.  However, after the Mongols besieged the city, it withstood the siege only for 45 days.

By the material, provided by archaeological excavations the city was burnt, the unburied remains of its population could be found all over Bilär. The excavations prove the Kazan Tatar legends and the Russian chronicles, which wrote that the Mongols:

Then Mongols destroyed many Bulgarian cities, but the north of the country remained intact, so many survivors resettled to the North and to the West from the Bulgarian mainland. The country was incorporated to the Ulus Jochi, but the resistance lasted for forty years.

Some years after the fall of Bilär, Bolghars tried to revive the Great City, but this attempt had no result.

References
  История Татарстана, Казань, "ТаРИХ", 2001.
  История Татарской АССР, Казань, Татарское книжное издательство, 1980
 

History of Tatarstan
Volga Bulgaria
Bilar
Conflicts in 1236
1236 in Europe
1236 in the Mongol Empire